Belbeis (  ; Bohairic  ) is an ancient fortress city on the eastern edge of the southern Nile delta in Egypt, the site of the Ancient city and former bishopric of Phelbes and a Latin Catholic titular see.

The city is small in size but densely populated, with over 407,300 residents.  It also houses the Egyptian Air Force Academy complex, which contains the town's largest public school in Al-Zafer.

Coptic tradition says that Bilbeis was one of the stopping places of the Holy Family during the Flight into Egypt.

History 
The city was important enough in the Roman province of Augustamnica Secunda to become a bishopric.

Situated on a caravan and natural invasion route from the east, Belbeis was conquered in 640 by the Arabs. Amr ibn al-As besieged and took the city defended by a Byzantine general called al-Ardubun. According to a Muslim legend, Armanusa, the daughter of Muqawqis lived in Belbeis. In 727 some of the Qays tribe were resettled here and later chain of fortresses was built to protect Cairo.

The city played a role in the machinations for control of the Fatimid vizierate: first in 1164, when Shirkuh was besieged in the city by the combined forces of Shawar and crusader king Amalric I of Jerusalem for three months; then again in 1168 when the city was assaulted again by Amalric's army, who took the city after three days on 4 November and indiscriminately killed the inhabitants. This atrocity angered the Coptic Egyptians, who had seen the Crusaders as deliverers but had suffered as much as the Muslim inhabitants of Bilbeis. Many of the Copts ended their support of the Crusaders after this. (See Crusader invasion of Egypt.)

In 1798, its fortifications were rebuilt at the order of Napoleon.

Places of worship

Mosques 

 Sadat Quraish Mosque

The oldest mosque in Egypt, and perhaps the entirety of Africa, built in 640.

 Amir al-Gish Mosque
 The Great Mosque in Kesaria

Churches 

 Coptic church of St.George

Ecclesiastical history
The bishopric, a suffragan of the Metropolitan of provincial capital Leontopolis, faded.

Titular see 
The diocese of Phelbes was nominally restored in 1933 as a Latin Catholic titular bishopric.

It has had the following incumbents, all of the lowest (episcopal) rank :
 Enrico van Schingen, Jesuits (S.J.) (1936-12-17 – 1954-07-02)
 Antoine Henri van den Hurk, Capuchin Franciscans (O.F.M. Cap.) (1955-01-01 – 1961-01-03) as Apostolic Vicar of Medan (Indonesia) (1955-01-01 – 1961-01-03), promoted first Metropolitan Archbishop of Medan (1961-01-03 – 1976-05-24)
 Walmor Battú Wichrowski (1961-05-31 – 1971-05-27) & (1972-11-16 – 2001-10-31)
 Airton José dos Santos (2001-12-19 – 2004-08-04) as Auxiliary Bishop of Santo André (Brazil) (2001-12-19 – 2004-08-04), later Bishop of Mogi das Cruzes (Brazil) (2004-08-04 – 2012-02-15), Metropolitan Archbishop of Campinas (Brazil) (2012-02-15 – ... )
 Javier Augusto del Río Alba (2004-10-12 – 2006-07-11) as Auxiliary Bishop of Callao (Peru) (2004-10-12 – 2006-07-11), Coadjutor Archbishop of Arequipa (Peru) (2006-07-11 – 2006-10-20), succeeding as Metropolitan Archbishop of Arequipa (2006-10-20 – ... ), Second Vice-president of Episcopal Conference of Peru (January 2012 – ... )
 Janusz Wiesław Kaleta (2006-09-15 – 2011-02-05)
 Daniel Fernando Sturla Berhouet, Salesians (S.D.B.) (2011-12-10 – 2014-02-11) as Auxiliary Bishop of Montevideo (Uruguay) (2011-12-10 – 2014-02-11), succeeded as Metropolitan Archbishop of Montevideo (2014-02-11 – ... ), created Cardinal-Priest of S. Galla (2015-02-14 [2015-05-17] – ... )
 Jorge Ángel Saldía Pedraza,  Dominican Order (O.P.) (2014-03-25 – ... ), Auxiliary Bishop of La Paz (Bolivia)

Climate 
Bilbeis is classified by Köppen-Geiger climate classification system as hot desert (BWh), as the rest of Egypt.

See also 

 List of cities in Egypt

References 

Gibb, Sir Hamilton (2006). The Life of Saladin. Oxford University Press. .

External links 

Populated places in Sharqia Governorate
Nile Delta
Cities in Egypt